Eugene S. (E. S.) Stevens (born Eugene S. Pysh December 29, 1938) is a Professor of Physical Chemistry at Binghamton University. He is best known for his research in biodegradable plastics. He has been a quoted expert in articles published in the New York Times, Bloomberg Businessweek, and the International Herald Tribune.

Education
Stevens received a Bachelor of Science degree in Chemistry from Yale University and his doctorate in Chemistry from the University of Chicago. Funded by a National Science Foundation Fellowship, he completed his postdoctoral work at Harvard University.

Career
Stevens has conducted research in the area of biopolymers for over 30 years.  He is the author of ‘’Green Plastics: An Introduction to the New Science of Biodegradable Plastics’’ (Princeton University Press, 2002), the first general audience book about the research and development of biodegradable plastics made from plants.  In 2012, the book inspired the invention of an edible LED lamp.

Stevens' research has involved the use of abundant, renewable biopolymer resources, specifically polysaccharides—including starch, cellulose, and agar—for the production of degradable, biodegradable, and compostable products that conserve the use of fossil resources and divert waste plastics from landfills and incinerators.  His research has been supported by grants from funders such as the National Science Foundation.
  
His early career focused on studying the conformational behavior of biomolecules, a topic he has explored through chiroptic methods.

Stevens joined the faculty of Binghamton University in 1977.  In 2011, he received the Chancellor’s Award for Excellence in Faculty Service.

Stevens has served as a speaker for the American Chemical Society, reaching students and general audiences throughout the U.S.

Publications

In addition to his book, Stevens has written numerous articles that have appeared in publications such as the Journal of Chemical Education and the Journal of Biobased Materials and Bioenergy.  He also has been quoted in BusinessWeek regarding biotechnology advances.

Memberships

Stevens is a member of the American Chemical Society and the American Society for Testing and Materials.

References

21st-century American chemists
1938 births
Living people
Binghamton University faculty